Tiaan Marx (born 17 March 1986) is a South African rugby union footballer. He plays for White River Rugby Club in the Gold Cup, South Africa. He plays mostly as a centre.

References

External links
 
 

Living people
1986 births
South African rugby union players
Rugby union centres
People from Mbombela
Pumas (Currie Cup) players
Sharks (Currie Cup) players
Leopards (rugby union) players
Rugby union players from Mpumalanga